Puli Vesham is a 2011 Indian Tamil-language action film written and directed by P. Vasu, starring R. K., Karthik,  Sadha and newcomer Divya Vishwanath. Puli Vesham released on 26 August 2011 to negative reviews. The film was a remake of Kannada film Muniya.

Plot
Munian (R. K.) is the innocent-turned-underworld dada. The naive youngster from a remote village becomes a dreaded dada who could fix anyone and anything for money. He spends the money to treat a girl who is in coma for six months. Who is that girl and why does he spend money for her?

The girl, Thamarai (Divya Padmini), is the daughter of a rich man (Ilavarasu) in Muniyan's native place. The rich man gives shelter to Muniyan at his earlier age after the death of his parents. Munian is given the responsibility of taking care of Thamarai. He takes the job very seriously and gets trained in martial arts just to protect her in any circumstance. A unique bond develops between them. Though it is not love, everyone suspects it to be love, and hence Munian is sent out of the village to save the girl. However, the girl doesn't want to get parted with him. She secretly follows him, and both of them get into an unexpected trouble in Chennai.

The turn of events puts the girl in a hospital and makes Munian a gangster. Munian however, has some values and hence becomes an associate to an honest ACP P. Easwara Moorthy (Karthik), who wants to eliminate the rowdies with Munian's help. The officer sends Ashwini (Sadha) in the disguise of an orphan to Munian's gang just to keep him under check.

Munian gets entangled with too many things before he could save his master's daughter. There are many players operating at different levels including the cricket crazy Govindan (Mansoor Ali Khan), who is involved in supplying girls to the rich, and Senthil (M. S. Bhaskar), a dreaded gangster. How he tackles everyone and achieves his goal forms the crux of the story.

Cast

Production
In 2010, P. Vasu announced that he would work with R. K. in a new project called "Puli Vesham" produced by R. K. himself. The unit was arguing over a title for the movie. There were three choices – Puli Vesham, Aarbaattam, and Mugamoodi. Rajini selected Puli Vesham as it suited the hero. Sadha was selected as heroine which marked her comeback in Tamil cinema and newcomer Divya Viswanath was selected to play second lead. For a fight scene, crew zeroed on a tree in Mahabalipuram and shot for 5 days involving 25 stunt actors. Meghna Naidu was selected to appear in an item song, she said to have fainted several times and her song was shot on a grand set erected by art director GK at a cost of Rs. 20 lakh. Veteran actor Karthik was selected to play a police officer while M. S. Baskar confirmed that he would don a negative character.

Soundtrack
Music composed by  Shrikanth Deva. The list of songs.

Release

Critical reception
Indiaglitz wrote:"From the hands of veteran Vasu, who has given us many a hit in the past, 'Puli Vesham', produced by Aarkay Worlds, is no match to 'Chandramukhi'. At the same time, it is no 'Paramasivan' too. It lies somewhere in between the two". Top 10 cinema wrote:"Vasu has done some justifications to the script, which includes the film's climax standing out as the major highlight of the film. But if he had an engrossing screenplay and avoided certain clichés, the film would have been a trademark in the director's career". Kollytalk wrote:"P. Vasu has given some different twists to the usual 'innocent-turned-ruffian' storyline. He has managed to make the movie move fast with many twists and turns. Plenty of characters with different shades make the script interesting. However, too much of complications mars the effectiveness of the script.

References

Films directed by P. Vasu
2010s Tamil-language films
Films scored by Srikanth Deva
Tamil remakes of Kannada films